Helianthemum nummularium (known as common rock-rose) is a species of rock-rose (Cistaceae), native to most of Europe.

Description
It  is an evergreen trailing plant with loose terminal clusters of bright yellow, saucer-shaped flowers. In the flower centre is a tight cluster of orange stamens, which are sensitive to the touch, and spread outwards to reveal the tall stigma in the middle. The plant is common on chalk downs, and occasional in other grasslands, always on dry, base-rich soil. The wild species has yellow flowers, but garden varieties range from white through yellow to deep red.

Though the individual blooms are short-lived, the plant produces a mass of flowers through the summer. It needs a dry, sunny place, like a south-facing rockery or meadow. As the Latin name Helianthemum suggests, these are sun-flowers. This is a good nectar source for bees and there are several species of small beetle that feed on the foliage. Common rock-rose is also the food plant for the larvae of several species of moth and butterfly such as the silver-studded blue (Plebejus argus).

It flowers from May until July.

Taxonomy

Subspecies
Two subspecies are currently accepted:
Helianthemum nummularium subsp. kerneri (Gottl.-Tann. & Janch.) Lambinon
Helianthemum nummularium subsp. nummularium. Widespread.

Gallery

subsp. grandiflorum (Scop.) Schinz & Thell.

subsp. nummularium

subsp. obscurum (Čelak.) Holub)

Pink-flowered cultivars

Illustrations

Unclassified images of Helianthemum nummularium

References

Flora Europaea: Helianthemum nummularium

numularium
Flora of Lebanon
Flora of Western Asia
Taxa named by Philip Miller